Government Post Graduate College may refer to:

 Government Post Graduate College (Chakwal)
 Government Post Graduate College (Jhang)
 Government Post Graduate College (Sahiwal)
 Government Post Graduate College (Swabi)
 Government Post Graduate College, Mansehra